La Flotte (sometimes locally La Flotte-en-Re), is a commune on the Île de Ré off the western coast of France, administratively part of the department of Charente-Maritime within the larger Nouvelle-Aquitaine region. 

It is the largest municipality on the Île de Ré by area, and the second largest by population, second to Sainte-Marie-de-Ré on the southern tip of the island. 

La Flotte was declared one of the most beautiful villages in France by the eponymous independent tourism organization Les Plus Beaux Villages de France, and since 2011, the town has been a part of the departmental government's  "Stone and Water Villages" tourism initiative to promote notable coastal and waterfront locales (i.e., where the stone (city) meets the water (sea, river etc.).

Geography 
The commune of La Flotte contains the town proper and a marina. The shoreline is bordered by small cliffs, and is home to Arnéult Beach, an artificial beach that has to be re-sanded each year.

Town Planning 
La Flotte is an urban municipality, part of the urban unit of La Flotte, which also contains the commune of Saint-Martin-de-Ré. In addition, the municipality is part of the attraction area of La Flotte, covering 4 communes.

The municipality, bordered by the Atlantic Ocean , is also a coastal municipality within the meaning of the law ofJanuary 3, 1986, known as the coastal law  . From then on, specific town planning provisions apply in order to preserve natural spaces, sites, landscapes and the ecological balance of the coast , such as for example the principle of inconstructibility, outside urbanized areas, on the strip. coastline of 100 meters, or more if the local urban plan provides for it  ,  .

Land Use 
The zoning of the municipality, as reflected in the database European occupation biophysical soil Corine Land Cover (CLC), is marked by the importance of the agricultural land (47% in 2018), nevertheless down from 1990 (55.1%). The detailed breakdown in 2018 is as follows: forests (34.3%), permanent crops (18.3%), urbanized areas (17.9%), heterogeneous agricultural areas (15.9%), arable land (9, 1%), meadows (3.7%), artificial green spaces, non-agricultural (0.5%), coastal wetlands (0.4%)  .

The IGN also provides an online tool to compare the evolution over time of land use in the municipality (or in territories at different scales). Several eras are accessible as aerial maps or photos: the Cassini map ( xviii th  century), the map of Staff (1820-1866) and the current period (1950 to present)  .

Economic Activity 

 Agriculture, asparagus, potatoes, vine.
 Oyster farming, boating, fishing.
 Tourism. Accommodation: six hotels, five campsites, guest houses, seasonal rentals.

History 
the November 6, 1627, the regiment of the French Guards attacks the English troops, of George Villiers duke of Buckingham , who besiege the citadel of Saint-Martin-de-Ré , defended by Jean du Caylar de Saint-Bonnet, marquis de Toiras . After causing the English assault to fail, the French Guards retreated through the town of La Flotte, burned three English vessels there in the port and returned to Fort La Prée  .

Gustave Dechézeaux's native village (October 8, 1760 - January 17, 1794) . Member of the National Convention . Unjustly accused, he was guillotined at Rochefort then rehabilitated by the Convention onApril 18, 1795.

Government 

* For 1855, municipal councilor acting as mayor.

** For the year 1870, from 21st of October to July, (Fourgnaud, Brin, Margotteau, Biret) municipal commission

2008 Municipal Elections

2001 Municipal Elections

1995 Municipal Elections

1989 Municipal Elections

Demographics 
Its inhabitants are called the Flottais and the Flottaises. In 2018, the town had 2,759 inhabitants, down 4.8% compared to 2013 (Charente-Maritime: + 2.13%, France excluding Mayotte: +1.78%).

Culture and Heritage

Places and Monuments 

 The Port: it was a commercial port for wine and salt, then a fishing port. It is essentially a marina today. Its capacity is 200 berths on pontoons and 150 berths in organized moorings. The boats celebrate during the "night shadows" sound and light and during the harbor festival in May of each year.
 The ruins of the Cistercian Abbey of Notre-Dame-de-Ré (between Rivedoux-Plage and La Flotte). The whole has been classified as a “historic monument” sinceMay 21, 1990.
 The Fort La Pree built in 1625 and partially destroyed by Vauban in 1685 .
 The Medieval Market.
 La Maison du Platin, museum fishing, shore fishing, oyster farming, the rétaise flottaise and life (photo collections from the early xx th  century and models).
 The Church of St. Catherine Fleet (or "Church of St. Catherine of Alexandria") dating from the xv th  century. Listed, in part, as a Historic Monument, in 1988  .

The village is one of the most beautiful villages in France .

Historical Figures from La Flotte 

 Nicolas Martiau (1591-1657), Huguenot settler, ancestor of George Washington and General Lee .
 Denis Goguet (1704-1778), merchant and shipowner
 Gustave Dechézeaux (October 8, 1760 in La Flotte-en-Ré - January 17, 1794in Rochefort), French politician. Member of the National Convention , sentenced to death "for having conspired against the Republic", guillotined, then rehabilitated by this same Convention.
 Jacques Gilles Henri Goguet (1767-1794), general
 Léon Gendre, general councilor of the canton of Saint-Martin-de-Ré (reelected in 2011), president of the Community of communes of the island of Ré from 1993 to 2008, mayor of La Flotte since 1977, ex-restaurateur (creator of the restaurant Le Richelieu).
 M me Tencin , salonnière and woman of letters who had Grainetière between 1735 and 1749.
 Roger Barberot (1915-2002) -, Companion of the Liberation by decree ofMarch 7, 1941, the most decorated sailor in France in 1944, owned a property there near the market.

Heraldry

See also 
 Communes of the Charente-Maritime department
 List of localities belonging to the association Les Plus Beaux Villages de France

References

External links
 

Communes of Charente-Maritime
Plus Beaux Villages de France
Île de Ré
Charente-Maritime communes articles needing translation from French Wikipedia
Populated coastal places in France